Haigang is a district of the coastal city of Qinhuangdao, Hebei province, People's Republic of China.

Administrative divisions
There are 13 subdistricts and 8 towns in Haigang District.

Subdistricts:
Wenhua Road Subdistrict
Haibin Road Subdistrict
Beihuan Road Subdistrict
Jianshe Avenue Subdistrict
Hedong Subdistrict
Xigang Road Subdistrict
Yanshan Avenue Subdistrict
Gangcheng Avenue Subdistrict
Donghuan Road Subdistrict
Baitaling Subdistrict
Qinhuangdao Economic and Technological Development Zone  Zhujiang Street Subdistrict
Huanghe Street Subdistrict
Tengfei Road Subdistrict

Towns:
Donggang
Haigang Town
Xigang
Haiyang
Beigang
Shimenzhai
Zhucaoying 
Duzhuang

References

County-level divisions of Hebei
Qinhuangdao